David Bartholot (born 26 September 1995) is an Australian representative rower. He is an Australian national champion and represented in the double-scull at the 2019 and 2022 World Championships.

Club and state rowing
Bartholot was raised in Forster on the New South Wales Mid North Coast. He started rowing at Sydney University where he commenced studies in 2015. He was a resident at St Andrew's College and his senior club rowing has been from the Sydney University Boat Club.

In 2018 in SUBC colours Bartholot contested the open men's single and double scull titles at the Australian Rowing Championships. In 2019 he contested the open men's single scull and won the open's men's quad scull national championship title in an SUBC/ANU composite crew. He won another open's men's quad scull national title in 2022 and that year was also selected as NSW's single sculling entrant, racing to victory in the President's Cup at the 2022 Interstate Regatta.

International representative rowing
Bartholot made his Australian representative debut in 2019.  He was selected to race a double scull with Luke Letcher at the World Rowing Cup II in Poznan where they placed nineteenth. At the WRC III in Rotterdam he rowed a single scull and placed twelfth. Bartholot and Caleb Antill were selected to race Australia's double scull at the 2019 World Rowing Championships in Linz, Austria. The double were looking for a top eleven finish at the 2019 World Championships to qualify for the Tokyo Olympics.  They were second in their heat, third in their quarter-final and fourth in their semi-final. They finished sixth in the B-final for an overall twelfth world place and failed to qualify the boat for Tokyo 2020.

In March 2022 Bartholot was selected in the Australian men's sculling squad in the broader Australian training team to prepare for the 2022 international season and the 2022 World Rowing Championships.  Racing with Caleb Antill in the double, Bartolot won silver at the World Rowing Cup III in Lucerne. At the 2022 World Rowing Championships at Racize, he raced with Antill in Australia's representative double scull. They qualified for the A final and raced to a third place and a bronze medal at the World Championships.

References

External links

1995 births
Living people
Australian male rowers
World Rowing Championships medalists for Australia
21st-century Australian people